Fuciliere was the name of at least two ships of the Italian Navy and may refer to:

 , a  launched in 1909 and discarded in 1932.
 , a  launched in 1938 and transferred to Russia under the designation Z 20. Stricken about 1958.

Italian Navy ship names